Las noches de Tefía is a 2023 Spanish television series created, co-written, and co-directed by . It is set in a Francoist concentration camp for vagrants, dissidents, and homosexuals in the island of Fuerteventura.

Plot 

Cast

Production 
The series was produced by Buendía Estudios alongside Atresmedia.

Release 
The series will premiere on Atresplayer Premium.

References 

Television shows set in the Canary Islands
Television series set in the 1960s
Television series set in 2004
Spanish LGBT-related television shows
Spanish drama television series
Spanish-language television shows
Atresplayer Premium original programming
2020s LGBT-related drama television series